The 1796 United States presidential election in Pennsylvania took place as part of the 1796 United States presidential election. Voters chose 15 representatives, or electors to the Electoral College, who voted for President and Vice President.

Pennsylvania voted for the Democratic-Republican candidate, Thomas Jefferson, over the Federalist candidate, John Adams. Jefferson won Pennsylvania by a margin of 1.16%. Greene County's returns, which favored Jefferson, were not submitted in time to be included in the official vote totals. As a result, the 2 highest vote-getting Adams electors received more votes than the 2 lowest vote-getting Jefferson electors and the electoral vote was split, with 14 of 15 electors casting their ballots for Jefferson.

Results

County results

See also
 List of United States presidential elections in Pennsylvania

Notes

References

Pennsylvania
1796
1796 Pennsylvania elections